Fujiyama (written: 藤山) is a Japanese surname. Notable people with the surname include:

, Japanese politician and business executive
 Cosmo Fujiyama (born 1985), Japanese-American philanthropist
, Japanese singer and composer
, Japanese actress
, Japanese footballer
 Shin Fujiyama, Japanese-American philanthropist
, Japanese footballer

Japanese-language surnames